Merry-Go-Round is a 1981 film by Jacques Rivette, starring Maria Schneider and Joe Dallesandro. The film is a crime drama revolving around a kidnapping plot. Elizabeth (Danièle Gégauff) sends telegrams to her old boyfriend Ben (Dallesandro) in New York City and to her younger sister Léo (Schneider) in Rome to join her in Paris, where she is selling her dead father's estate. The scenario was written by Rivette in collaboration with Eduardo de Gregorio and Suzanne Schiffman, with dialogue by de Gregorio. Distributed by Roissy Films.

Filming
Merry-Go-Round was conceived in the aftermath of the collapse of Rivette's projected four-film series Scenes de la vie parallele (of which only Duelle and Noroît were completed). Schneider exited the film during shooting, and in some scenes Léo is played by Hermine Karagheuz.

In an interview with Serge Daney and Jean Narboni, Rivette describes the film's process: "We started work with the two actors, and after 8 days, things were going very badly. It was like a machine that, once set in motion, must continue running despite changing regimes, forced or arbitrary accelerations, until the energy was all burned up, exhausted.... We had a starting point of course, and then we made up the beginning of a story, with a father who had disappeared, but all along we told ourselves, this is just a pretext for Maria and Joe to get to know each other.I like that idea: two people get together because a third, who has arranged to meet them, does not show up. There have no choice but to get to know each other. It's a situation I imagined in the context of the Resistance. Thinking about it again later, I think it was the subject of Robert Hossein's Nuit des espions. And since I didn't feel like making a film about the Resistance or the terrorist underground, it became that more banal situation, two people convoked by a third who is only the sister of the one and the girlfriend of the other. But since the relationship between Maria and Joe rapidly became hostile, we were forced to develop the story-line; from a mere pretext it took on a disproportionate importance. Maybe that gives the film a certain vagabond charm, I don't know, but it really is a film with a first half-hour that's quite coherent, and then it searches for itself three times."

References

External links

1981 films
1981 crime drama films
French crime drama films
1980s French-language films
Films directed by Jacques Rivette
1980s English-language films
1980s French films